Alexander Drew may refer to:

Alexander Drew, character in True Blood
Alexander Drew (tennis), competed in 1924 Wimbledon Championships – Men's Singles
Alexander Drew (company), taken over by Coloroll